HMS Snowdrop was an  sloop  of the Royal Navy. She served during the First World War. Snowdrop survived the war and was sold for scrap in 1923.

Design and construction
The Azalea class was based on the previous , but with a heavier gun armament. They were designed at the start of the First World War as relatively fast minesweepers that could also carry out various miscellaneous duties in support of the fleet such as acting as dispatch vessels or carrying out towing operations, but as the war continued and the threat from German submarines grew, became increasingly involved in anti-submarine duties.

Displacement was  normal. The Azeleas had a main armament of two 4.7-inch (120 mm) or 4-inch (102 mm) guns, with two 3-pounder (47 mm) anti-aircraft guns also carried. Snowdrop had a crew of 90 officers and other ranks.

Snowdrop was ordered on 4 May 1915 from the Scottish shipbuilder Archibald McMillan & Son, and was built at their Dumbarton shipyard as Yard number 463. She was launched on 7 October 1915, and was completed on 3 December 1915.

Career
Snowdrop joined the 1st Sloop Flotilla, operating under the Vice Admiral Commanding, Coast of Ireland, following commissioning. In March 1916, Snowdrop was employed on escort duties. On 29 March, the sloop  was torpedoed by the German submarine , and Snowdrop and sister ship  were ordered to go to Begonias assistance. Begonia was towed to Queenstown (now Cobh). Following the outbreak of the Easter Rising against British rule in Ireland in April 1916, Snowdrop escorted a transport carrying troops to Galway on 30 April.

On 17 January 1917, Snowdrop and the sloop  were escorting the merchant ship SS Castalia when the German submarine  fired a torpedo which narrowly missed Myosotis. Myosotis opened fire on U-57 s conning tower and the submarine dived away to safety. Snowdrop rescued all but one of Canadians crew. On 23 April, the German submarine  attacked the steamer  with a torpedo and gunfire. The British submarine  drove off U-50 and later that day, Snowdrop took Dykland under tow at a speed of only , attempting to bring the damaged ship back to Bantry Bay. On 26 April, the tow parted, and the sloop  took over the towing duties, but Dykland finally sank later that day, still  short of safety. On 16 October 1917, Snowdrop took the American destroyer  in tow, after the Cassin had been torpedoed by  the previous day.

Snowdrop survived the war and continued in service until being sold for breaking up on 15 January 1923 to the Unity Ship Breaking Company.

References

 
 
 
 
 
 
 

 

Azalea-class sloops
1915 ships